Monocercops resplendens is a moth of the family Gracillariidae. It is known from India (West Bengal, Meghalaya, Uttaranchal) and Nepal.

The wingspan is 6.7–9.9 mm.

The larvae feed on Shorea robusta. They mine the leaves of their host plant.

References

Acrocercopinae
Moths of Asia
Moths described in 1862